Telecom Cambodia (TC) is a state corporation of Cambodia, and is the principal telecom company of that country. The company was launched in 2006 as part of the Royal Government's Second Mandate, by the Ministry of Posts and Telecommunications, which until then had operated the country's telecom network itself.  The head offices of the company are located in Phnom Penh.  TC provides service to every province of Cambodia.

Internet
Telecom Cambodia operates CamNet, Cambodia's first internet service provider.

See also
 Communications in Cambodia
 Government of Cambodia
 Telecommunications

References

External links
 Telecom Cambodia
 CamNet
 Ministry of Posts and Telecommunications

Government-owned companies of Cambodia
Telecommunications companies of Cambodia
Telecommunications companies established in 2006
Cambodian brands
Government-owned telecommunications companies
Cambodian companies established in 2006
Companies based in Phnom Penh